Waterloo wind farm is east of Manoora, South Australia. It is the largest wind farm operated by EnergyAustralia.

Site

The wind farm is positioned along a rocky north–south ridge on privately owned property at Waterloo. The 111 megawatt wind farm spreads across five acres of land and cost about $350 million, it began construction in November, 2008 and has been operational since October 2010.

For about two months in 2013, the site was monitored by the Environmental Protection Authority.  The wind farm's infrasound and low-frequency noise were both examined. Acoustics firm Resonate conducted noise and meteorological monitoring in the area.

Turbines
Waterloo wind farm opened with 37 Vestas V90-3MW turbines, each 80 metres high, with each turbine blade 44 metres long and weighing about 8 tonnes. The tower sections weigh approximately 90 tonnes in total with the tower and blades combined weighing 125 tonnes. On average the blades turn at 16.2 rpm. There are four levels in a turbine and it takes about five minutes to get to the top.

Each wind turbine produces on average 24 megawatt hours of electricity each day. On a windy day three wind turbines can power the whole of Clare and the whole wind farm can power up to 163,000 homes or 5 to 10% of South Australia.

See also

List of wind farms in South Australia
Wind power in South Australia

References

Wind farms in South Australia
2010 establishments in Australia
Energy infrastructure completed in 2010